The Kenya Footballers Welfare Association, generally referred to as KEFWA, is a sports union for football players. Its headquarters are in Nairobi, Kenya. KEFWA has Victor Wanyama and Denis Oliech as the honorary President and Vice President respectively.

History 
KEFWA was formed in September 2011 in response to a perceived need to defend the rights of professional football players who at times are treated unfairly by employers (football clubs). The association's stated intent is to act on behalf of the players in contract disputes, non payment of salaries, underpayment of players and improper insurance cover.

Administration

Chairman : James Situma

Secretary General : Jerry Santos

 Communications Manager : Terry Ouko

Head of Education and Training: Dan Makori

 Recruitment and welfare Officer : Victor Ashinga

Software Engineer : Savio Wambugu 

Cinematographer : Noah Okeyo

Photographer : Lenny Towett

Front Office Administrator : Rukia Yusuf

Media Liaison Officer : Paul Ombati

Mission statement
KEFWA is the exclusive collective national voice of footballers (male & female) in Kenya and is investing in a better and more sustainable future for both current and former footballers.

See also
Football in Kenya

References 

Association football trade unions